Suman Kundu is a wrestler from India who won a bronze medal in women's wrestling in the 63 kg freestyle category at the 2010 Commonwealth Games.

Kundu hails from Kalwa in the Jind district of Haryana.

References

Indian female sport wrestlers
Sportswomen from Haryana
Living people
Wrestlers at the 2010 Commonwealth Games
People from Jind district
Commonwealth Games bronze medallists for India
Wrestlers at the 2010 Asian Games
Commonwealth Games medallists in wrestling
21st-century Indian women
21st-century Indian people
Female sport wrestlers from Haryana
Year of birth missing (living people)
Asian Games competitors for India
Medallists at the 2010 Commonwealth Games